Buzz was an A3 (broadsheet) British comic book magazine that ran from 20 January 1973 to 4 January 1975, when it merged with The Topper. Buzz ran for 103 Issues.

List of Buzz comic strips
These are in alphabetical order and all numbers refer to issues of Buzz.

References

See also

List of DC Thomson publications

DC Thomson Comics titles
Comics magazines published in the United Kingdom
Defunct British comics
British humour comics
1973 comics debuts
1975 comics endings
Magazines established in 1973
Magazines disestablished in 1975
Weekly magazines published in the United Kingdom